The Kurrajong electorate is one of the five electorates for the unicameral 25-member Australian Capital Territory Legislative Assembly. It elected five members at the 2016 ACT election.

History
Kurrajong was created in 2016, when the five-electorate, 25-member Hare-Clark electoral system was first introduced for the Australian Capital Territory (ACT)  Legislative Assembly, replacing the previous three-electorate, 17-member system. The name "Kurrajong" is derived from an Aboriginal word for the tree (Brachychiton populneus, meaning "shade tree", and also Kurrajong Hill, the name early settlers used for Capital Hill, the location of Parliament House.

Location
The Kurrajong electorate currently comprises the majority of the district of Canberra Central, including the suburbs of Acton, Ainslie, Barton, Braddon, Campbell, Civic, Dickson, Downer, Forrest, Griffith, Hackett, Kingston, Lyneham, Narrabundah, O'Connor, Red Hill, Reid, Turner, Watson, and the entirety of the Jerrabomberra, Kowen and Majura districts including the suburbs of Beard, Hume, Oaks Estate, Pialligo and Symonston.

On the original boundaries contested in 2016 Kurrajong additionally included the suburbs of Deakin and Yarralumla. However the boundary redistribution conducted in 2019 transferred both these suburbs to the Murrumbidgee electorate.

Members

1 Steve Doszpot (Liberal) died on 25 November 2017. Candice Burch (Liberal) was elected as his replacement on a countback on 13 December 2017.

See also
 Australian Capital Territory Electoral Commission
 Australian Capital Territory Legislative Assembly

References

External links
 ACT Electoral Commission

Electorates of the Australian Capital Territory